

Adelaide Fire Station is a fire station located in Adelaide, the state capital of South Australia.

It was designed by architects Rod Roach and Woodhead Australia, it is notable "for its innovative design is an outstanding example of postmodern architecture", it was designed and built during 1976 to 1983.

The complex includes auxiliary buildings and a concrete training tower.

It was listed on the South Australian Heritage Register on 16 September 2015.

See also
List of fire stations
Timeline of Adelaide history, which mentions large fires, including one across from a predecessor fire station

References

External links
Official webpage

Fire stations in South Australia
Buildings and structures in Adelaide
Government buildings in South Australia
South Australian Heritage Register